Herminia is a female given name. Notable people with the name include:

 Herminia Albarrán Romero, Mexican-American artist 
 Herminia Álvarez Herrera (1888–1955), Mexican Revolutionary War veteran, propagandis, personal tutor, governess
 Herminia Arrate (1895-1941), Chilean painter and First Lady of Chile
 Herminia Borchard Dassel (1821-1857), German-American painter
 Herminia Bouza (born 1965), Cuban javelin thrower
 Herminia Brumana (1897-1954), Argentine teacher, writer, journalist
 Hermínia da Cruz Fortes, better known as Hermínia d'Antónia de Sal, (1941-2010), Cape Verdean singer
 Herminia D. Dierking (1939-2008), Guamanian educator, a cabinet member of the Government of Guam
 Herminia Ibarra, professor at London Business School
 Herminia Naglerowa (1890-1957), Polish writer and publicist
 Herminia Palacio, U.S. nonprofit executive; CEO of the Guttmacher Institute
 Herminia Rodríguez Fernández (died 1944), Cuban politician
 Herminia Roman (born 1940), Filipino politician
 María Herminia Sabbia y Oribe (1883-1961), Uruguayan poet
 Hermínia Silva (1907-1993), Portuguese fado singer
 Maria Hermínia Tavares de Almeida, Brazilian political scientist, sociologist, professor
 Herminia Tormes García (1891-1964), Puerto Rican lawyer

See also
 Hermina (given name)

Herminia